Bayles Lake is a freshwater reservoir located in west Loda, Illinois in Iroquois County, 13.6 miles from Onarga and separated by a road from Lake Iroquois, Illinois.

Fishing 
Known for the high ranked fishing, Bayles Lake is one of the best ranked fishing locations in North America holding five state record fish (walleye, green sunfish, brown bullhead, white crappie, and hybrid sunfish).
The lake's most popular fish are the following species:

Bayles Lake is annually stocked with fish species other than the ones listed above. Fishermen will find a variety of fish including channel catfish, blue catfish, sunfish, largemouth bass, walleye, smallmouth bass, white catfish, striped bass, flathead catfish, crappie, bluegill, yellow bass, white bass, rock bass, panfish, and white perch here. Fishing came to be one of the top attractions at Bayles Lake due to the high density of fish. Though the lake does not contain sea weed, fish happen to thrive in the waters and grow to tremendous sizes. Fisherman find it convenient not to deal with as many snags and weeds getting caught on their lures.

History 
Bayles Lake is a man-made reservoir constructed in the late 1940s fed by a natural spring.  On November 17, 1952, at a special meeting, the board of directors of the corporation known as the Bayles Lake, Inc., made and executed the Bayles Lake Covenants. In 1969, Bayles Lake Inc. assigned all the rights reserved to it over to the Bayles Lake Lot Owners Association, a not-for-profit corporation. This assignment, including the rights under the Covenants, was filed in the Iroquois County recorder's office in Watseka, Illinois. The association, therefore, owns all the lakes, roads, parks, all lands not specifically dedicated, and the water and sewer systems. In 2008 the Bayles Lake Lot Owners Association became the Bayles Lake Homeowners Association (BLHOA) and in 2009 a website was created www.bayleslakehoa.com

References
http://www.bayleslakehoa.com/documents/LakeManagementStudyPartOne.pdf
http://bayleslakehoa.com/documents/1974DNRLakeDepthStudy.pdf
http://www.bayleslakehoa.com/documents/BaylesLakeWatershedInformation_000.pdf
http://bayleslakehoa.com/documents/CurrentIEPANewsandourSewerProject.pdf
http://www.bayleslakehoa.com/documents/BaylesLakeNaturalHabitatArea.pdf
http://bayleslakehoa.com/secure/documents/6336DamInspection-Report.pdf
http://bayleslakehoa.com/secure/documents/6336DamInspection-Photos.pdf

External links 
http://bayleslakehoa.com/
http://www.fishingworks.com/lakes/illinois/iroquois/buckley/bayles-lake/
http://www.hookandbullet.com/fishing-bayles-lake-onarga-il/

Bodies of water of Iroquois County, Illinois
Reservoirs in Illinois